The 2019–20 season was Levante Unión Deportiva's 81st season in existence and the club's 3rd consecutive season in the top flight of Spanish football. In addition to the domestic league, Levante participated in this season's edition of the Copa del Rey. The season was slated to cover a period from 1 July 2019 to 30 June 2020. It was extended extraordinarily beyond 30 June due to the COVID-19 pandemic in Spain.

Players

Current squad

Reserve team

Out on loan

Transfers

In 

 Total Spending: €12.6M

Out

Pre-season and friendlies

Competitions

Overview

La Liga

League table

Results summary

Results by round

Matches
The La Liga schedule was announced on 4 July 2019.

Copa del Rey

Statistics

Appearances and goals
Last updated on the end of the season.

|-
! colspan=14 style=background:#dcdcdc; text-align:center|Goalkeepers

|-
! colspan=14 style=background:#dcdcdc; text-align:center|Defenders

|-
! colspan=14 style=background:#dcdcdc; text-align:center|Midfielders

|-
! colspan=14 style=background:#dcdcdc; text-align:center|Forwards

|-
! colspan=14 style=background:#dcdcdc; text-align:center| Players who have made an appearance or had a squad number this season but have left the club

|-
|}

Notes

References

External links

Levante UD seasons
Levante UD